Nils Johannes Sejersted (17 October 1865 – 19 September 1921) was a Norwegian military officer and director.

He was a son of Fredrik Christian Sejersted (1833–1882), Lieutenant Colonel and director of the Norwegian Mapping and Cadastre Authority (then known as Norges Geografiske Oppmåling). Himself, Nils Johannes Sejersted became director of Mapping and Cadastre Authority too, and held the military rank of colonel. He died in the Nidareid train disaster.

He was a grandfather of Francis Sejersted.

References

1865 births
1921 deaths
Norwegian Army personnel
Directors of government agencies of Norway
Railway accident deaths in Norway